William Shakespeare's style of writing was borrowed from the conventions of the day and adapted to his needs.

Overview
William Shakespeare's first plays were written in the conventional style of the day. He wrote them in a stylised language that does not always spring naturally from the needs of the characters or the drama. The poetry depends on extended, elaborate metaphors and conceits, and the language is often rhetorical—written for actors to declaim rather than speak. For example, the grand speeches in Titus Andronicus, in the view of some critics, often hold up the action, and the verse in The Two Gentlemen of Verona has been described as stilted.

Soon, however, William  Shakespeare began to adapt the traditional styles to his own purposes. The opening soliloquy of Richard III has its roots in the self-declaration of Vice in medieval drama. At the same time, Richard's vivid self-awareness looks forward to the soliloquies of Shakespeare's mature plays. No single play marks a change from the traditional to the freer style. Shakespeare combined the two throughout his career, with Romeo and Juliet perhaps the best example of the mixing of the styles. By the time of Romeo and Juliet, Richard II, and A Midsummer Night's Dream in the mid-1590s, Shakespeare had begun to write a more natural poetry. He increasingly tuned his metaphors and images to the needs of the drama itself.

Shakespeare's standard poetic form was blank verse, composed in iambic pentameter with clever use of puns and imagery. In practice, this meant that his verse was usually unrhymed and consisted of ten syllables to a line, spoken with a stress on every second syllable. The blank verse of his early plays is quite different from that of his later ones. It is often beautiful, but its sentences tend to start, pause, and finish at the end of lines, with the risk of monotony. Once Shakespeare mastered traditional blank verse, he began to interrupt and vary its flow. This technique releases the new power and flexibility of the poetry in plays such as Julius Caesar and Hamlet. Shakespeare uses it, for example, to convey the turmoil in Hamlet's mind:

After Hamlet, Shakespeare varied his poetic style further, particularly in the more emotional passages of the late tragedies. The literary critic A. C. Bradley described this style as "more concentrated, rapid, varied, and, in construction, less regular, not seldom twisted or elliptical". In the last phase of his career, Shakespeare adopted many techniques to achieve these effects. These included enjambments, irregular pauses and stops, and extreme variations in sentence structure and length. In Macbeth, for example, the language darts from one unrelated metaphor or simile to another in one of Lady Macbeth's well-known speeches:

And in Macbeth's preceding speech:

The audience is challenged to complete the sense. The late romances, with their shifts in time and surprising turns of plot, inspired a last poetic style in which long and short sentences are set against one another, clauses are piled up, subject and object are reversed, and words are omitted, creating an effect of spontaneity.

Shakespeare's poetic genius was allied with a practical sense of the theatre. Like all playwrights of the time, Shakespeare dramatised stories from sources such as Petrarch and Holinshed. He reshaped each plot to create several centres of interest and show as many sides of a narrative to the audience as possible. This strength of design ensures that a Shakespeare play can survive translation, cutting and wide interpretation without loss to its core drama. As Shakespeare's mastery grew, he gave his characters clearer and more varied motivations and distinctive patterns of speech. He preserved aspects of his earlier style in the later plays, however. In his late romances, he deliberately returned to a more artificial style, which emphasised the illusion of theatre.

Form
In some of Shakespeare's early works, punctuation at the end of the lines strengthens the rhythm. He and other dramatists at the time used this form of blank verse for much of the dialogue between characters to elevate the poetry of drama. To end many scenes in his plays he used a rhyming couplet, thus creating suspense. A typical example occurs in Macbeth as Macbeth leaves the stage to murder Duncan:

His plays make effective use of the soliloquy, in which a character makes a solitary speech, giving the audience insight to the character's motivations and inner conflict. The character either speaks to the audience directly (in the case of choruses, or characters that become epilogues), or more commonly, speaks to himself or herself in the fictional realm. Shakespeare's writing features extensive wordplay of double entendres and clever rhetorical flourishes. Humour is a key element in all of Shakespeare's plays. His works have been considered controversial through the centuries for his use of bawdy punning, to the extent that "virtually every play is shot through with sexual puns." Indeed, in the nineteenth century, popular censored versions of the plays were produced as The Family Shakspeare  by Henrietta Bowdler (writing anonymously) and later by her brother Thomas Bowdler. Comedy is not confined to Shakespeare's comedies, and is a core element of many of the tragedy and history plays. For example, comic scenes dominate over historical material in Henry IV, Part 1.

Similarities to contemporaries
Besides following the popular forms of his day, Shakespeare's general style is comparable to several of his contemporaries.  His works have many similarities to the writing of Christopher Marlowe, and seem to reveal strong influences from the Queen's Men's performances, especially in his history plays.  His style is also comparable to Francis Beaumont's and John Fletcher's, other playwrights of the time.

Shakespeare often borrowed plots from other plays and stories.  Hamlet, for example, is comparable to Saxo Grammaticus' Gesta Danorum. Romeo and Juliet is thought to be based on Arthur Brooke's narrative poem The Tragical History of Romeus and Juliet. King Lear is based on the story of King Leir in Historia Regum Britanniae by Geoffrey of Monmouth, which was retold in 1587 by Raphael Holinshed. Borrowing plots in this way was not uncommon at the time.  After Shakespeare's death, playwrights quickly began borrowing from his works, a tradition that continues to this day.

Differences from contemporaries
Shakespeare's works express the complete range of human experience. His characters were human beings who commanded the sympathy of audiences when many other playwrights' characters were flat or archetypes. Macbeth, for example, commits six murders by the end of the fourth act, and is responsible for many deaths offstage, yet still commands an audience's sympathy until the very end because he is seen as a flawed human being, not a monster. Hamlet knows that he must avenge the death of his father, but he is too indecisive, too self-doubting, to carry this out until he has no choice. His failings cause his downfall, and he exhibits some of the most basic human reactions and emotions. Shakespeare's characters were complex and human in nature. By making the protagonist's character development central to the plot, Shakespeare changed what could be accomplished with drama.

References
All references to Hamlet, unless otherwise specified, are taken from the Arden Shakespeare Q2. Under their referencing system, 3.1.55 means act 3, scene 1, line 55.

All references to Macbeth, unless otherwise specified, are taken from the Arden Shakespeare second series. Under their referencing system, III.I.55 means act 3, scene 1, line 55.

Sources

 
 
 
 
 
 
 
 
 
 
 
 
 
 
 
 
 
 
 
 
 
 
 
 
 
 
 
 
 
 
 
 
 
 

Style
Style (fiction)